Josh Olayinka Awotunde (born June 12, 1995) is an American track and field athlete who competes in the shot put and has a personal record of  outdoors and  indoors.

Personal life
Awotunde was born in Lanham, Maryland in 1995. He was raised in Franklinville, New Jersey, by parents Adeola and Christina Awotunde. He is a 2013 graduate of Delsea Regional High School in New Jersey. Awotunde attended University of South Carolina and graduated in 2017. He is of Nigerian ancestry.

Professional

NCAA
Awotunde competed for University of South Carolina, finishing second at the 2018 NCAA Division I Outdoor Track and Field Championships before graduating. Awotunde set his Personal Best in 2018 throwing .

Seasonal bests

References

External links

Josh Awotunde profile Team USA

1995 births
Living people
South Carolina Gamecocks men's track and field athletes
American male shot putters
American people of Yoruba descent
American sportspeople of Nigerian descent
People from Franklin Township, Gloucester County, New Jersey
Track and field athletes from New Jersey
African-American male track and field athletes
Athletes (track and field) at the 2019 Pan American Games
Pan American Games track and field athletes for the United States
21st-century African-American sportspeople